Godwari is a dialect of Marwari spoken in Godwar region of Rajasthan.
It is spoken between Ahor Tehsil of Jalore to Bali tehsil of Pali district.
Bisaldev raso is written in Godwari.

References 

Languages of Rajasthan